Raymond Schlemmer was a seminal figure in the early history of Scouting in France, from 1922 to 1952.

Career 
In late 1937, French Scouting sent Scoutmaster Schlemmer to the Cambodian, Laotian, and Vietnamese areas of Indochina to oversee the setting up of the Fédération Indochinoise des Associations du Scoutisme (FIAS, Indochinese Federation of Scouting Associations) in all three regions.

With the end of World War II, French Sea Scouting experienced a renewal due to the impetus of Schlemmer. In 1947, the Jamboree of Peace was held at Moisson, and Schlemmer directed a marine camp on an island in the Seine next to the Jamboree site, with the assistance of the French navy.

Retirement 
Schlemmer retired from Scouting in 1952, after 30 years of service, and was succeeded by Commander Marcel Pillet.

External links
https://www.webcitation.org/query?url=http://www.geocities.com/Yosemite/3546/hdvn.html&date=2009-10-25+11:49:20
http://sufmarins.ifrance.com/st_hilaire3.html

Scouting and Guiding in France
People associated with Scouting
Year of birth missing
Year of death missing
20th-century French people